Matthew Bullock was an American accused of inciting a riot, who fled to Canada and became a cause célèbre in the early 1920s. 

In Norlina in Warren County, North Carolina on 18 January 1921, Bullock's brother Plummer attempted to return 10 cents worth of bruised apples that a young white store clerk had switched for the ones that the 19-year-old Bullock had originally chosen. The storekeeper refused to exchange the apples, and a heated argument broke out; as other white men entered the store, Plummer Bullock left. Four nights later, an angry and armed white mob set out to "punish" Bullock for his "insolence"; they were met by a group of African American men determined to protect their neighborhood from the advancing mob.  A gunfight ensued, injuring a number of men on both sides.  Immediately thereafter, a deputized white mob swept into the Black neighborhood and arrested between 14 and 18 men; all were charged with "inciting to riot," while some were also charged with intent to murder.  Plummer Bullock was among this group, though his brother Matthew was not captured.  The men were all jailed in the county seat of Warrenton.

The next night, a white mob stormed the jail and lynched Plummer Bullock and his distant cousin Alfred Williams (whom many contend was with him in the  confrontation at the store). Matthew Bullock fled town, and eventually made it to Canada. There he settled in Hamilton, Ontario working in the construction industry.

When he was located in Canada in 1922, the state of North Carolina demanded his extradition, and Bullock was imprisoned in the Hamilton jail for immigration violations. In Canada he became a cause celebre as activists insisted that he would not receive a fair trial due to his race if extradited to North Carolina, and could face the same fate as his brother. The campaign for his release was led by the congregation of St. Paul's African Methodist Episcopal Church (In 1937 St. Paul's was renamed Stewart Memorial Church), Rev. J. D. Howell and Asst. pastor John Christie Holland.  Also very involved was the newspaper The Globe which gave extensive coverage to the case. There were five editorials about the case in the New York Times. In the United States the NAACP campaigned on Bullock's behalf, but the white residents of Norlina circulated a petition demanding his extradition. North Carolina Governor Cameron A. Morrison pressured the State Department to have Bullock returned to face trial.

On January 26, 1922 Charles Stewart, the Canadian minister of the interior, announced that Bullock would be released from detention in Hamilton, and that his illegal entry into Canada would be forgiven due to his exemplary behaviour while living in Canada. Only a few weeks later, however, the Americans reiterated their demands for extradition and Bullock was again arrested. The judge in Bullock's extradition hearing, Colin George Snider, demanded that prima facie evidence of Bullock's guilt be presented before he would be extradited.  Since almost all the evidence was eyewitness accounts, this would have forced the government of North Carolina to send witnesses to Hamilton. Governor Morrison rejected this, and the Canadian judge released Bullock.

References

 
 
 
"Hold Fugitive Negro Till Canada Decides Justice of His Plea." The Globe January 16, 1922 pg. 1
"Bullock Goes Free on his Own Record as Good Immigrant." The Globe January 28, 1922 pg. 1
"Bullock Safety Seems Assured." The Globe March 3, 1922 pg. 5

External links
 Mug shot of Matthew Bullock, 1921 (cbcnews.ca)

African-American people
Black Canadian people
Crimes in North Carolina
Canadian people of African-American descent
American people imprisoned abroad
Prisoners and detainees of Canada
American expatriates in Canada
People from Warren County, North Carolina